The Southport & Cheshire Lines Extension Railway was an early British railway company operating in the then county of Lancashire. It was constructed to link the Cheshire Lines Committee railway at Aintree to Southport. It operated from 1884 to 1952.

History
The Southport & Cheshire Lines Extension Railway was authorised by two Acts of Parliament, 11 August 1881 and 18 August 1882, the first authorising the line as far as Birkdale and the second the remaining section to Southport Lord Street. It was promoted by the Cheshire Lines Committee (CLC) and was a natural extension of their North Liverpool Extension Line to Southport.

The  line was built as a double track railway opening on 1 September 1884. The line was worked by the CLC under arrangements made in its Acts of Parliament, these Acts were ratified and amended in 1889 to allow working with other companies.

The railway remained independent until nationalisation in 1948.

Route 

North Liverpool Extension Line
Aintree Central, Aintree. 13 July 1880 – 7 November 1960.
Southport Junction
 Junction with Liverpool, Ormskirk and Preston Railway
Sefton and Maghull, Maghull. 1884–1952.
Lydiate, Lydiate. 1884–1952.
Altcar and Hillhouse, Altcar  1884–1952.
Junction with Liverpool, Southport and Preston Junction Railway 1884.
Mossbridge  1884–1917.
Woodvale, Woodvale. 1884–1952.
Ainsdale Beach, Ainsdale. 1901–1952.
Birkdale Palace, Birkdale. 1884–1952.
Southport Lord Street, Southport. 1884–1952.

Closure
Passenger services ended 7 January 1952 and goods six months later. The line remained in intermittent use from Aintree to Altcar and Hillhouse to provide access to private sidings until May 1960, when the line was finally lifted.

The route today
The trackbed forms part of National Cycle Network Route 62, the Trans Pennine Trail. From Woodvale northwards the trail is joined by the Southport Coastal Road.

In January 2019, the Campaign for Better Transport released a report identifying the line which was listed as Priority 2 for reopening. Priority 2 is for those lines which require further development or a change in circumstances (such as housing developments).

References
Footnotes

Sources

External links
 Historic map of railways in Liverpool
 Childwall railway station
 The line and mileages via Railwaycodes

Closed railway lines in North West England
Cheshire Lines Committee Lines
Rail transport in Merseyside
Railway lines opened in 1884
Railway lines closed in 1952
Rail trails in England